Balata village is a Palestinian suburb of Nablus, in the northern West Bank, located  east of the city center. Formerly its own village, it was annexed to the municipality of Nablus during Jordanian rule (1948–67). The village contains a number of well known sites: Tell Balata (considered to be Biblical Shechem), Jacob's Well and Joseph's Tomb.

The village is just north of Balata Camp, one of the largest Palestinian refugee camps.

Etymology
The village's name is Balata, the name of an old Arab village, which was preserved by local residents. Its pseudonym, al-Balad (meaning "the village"), is used to distinguish it from the Palestinian refugee camp of Balata which lies to the east and was established in 1950.

The village's name is transcribed in the writings of Eusebius (d. circa 339) and Jerome (d. 420), as Balanus or Balata. In the Samaritan chronicles, its Arabic names are transcribed as Balata ("a pavement of flat stone slabs") and Shejr al-Kheir ("tree of grace"). In the writings of Yaqut al-Hamawi (d. 1229), the Syrian geographer, its name is transcribed as al-Bulāṭa.

One theory holds that balata is a derivation of the Aramaic word Balut, meaning "acorn" (or, in Arabic, "oak"), while another theory holds that it is a derivation of the Byzantine-Roman era, from the Greek word platanos, meaning "terebinth", which grew around the village spring.

Location
A suburb of the city of Nablus, the village is situated on the southern part of Tell Balata, and covers about one-third of the tell. The built-up area was made up of 2.5 hectares (25 dunams) in 1945, and increased to more than 10 hectares (100 dunams) in 1980. To the east, is a vast plain, with the ways running east–west leading out through the pass from Jerusalem to Nablus and the coast, and the way to the northeast around Mount Ebal leading down to Wadi Fa'rah and the ford across the Jordan River at Jisr el-Damiyah.

History

Balata is a village on an ancient site, and it has ancient cisterns and canals. In 1896, a Samaritan sarcophagus was found at the house of a local fellah.

The history of the village is tied to that Jacob's Well and Joseph's Tomb. Benjamin of Tudela, (d. 1173), who visited the site in the 12th century, places it "A sabbath-way distance from Sichem," and says it contains Joseph's sepulcher. Yaqut al-Hamawi (d. 1229) wrote that it was "a village of the Nablus District in Filastin. The Jews say that it was here that Nimrud (Nimrod) ibn Ka´an threw Abraham into the fire; the learned, however, say this took place at Babil (Babylon), in Irak -and Allah alone knows the truth. There is here the spring called Ain al Khidr. Yusuf (Joseph) as Sadik -peace be on him! - was buried here, and his tomb is well known, lying under the tree".

The church built around Jacob's Well and the lands of the village of Balata belonged to the Benedictine nuns of Bethany in the 12th century. Written documentation from this time of the Crusades indicates that, Balata, also known as Balathas, was a Frankish settlement.

Ottoman era
Balata al-Balad, like the rest of Palestine, was incorporated into the Ottoman Empire in 1517, and in the census of 1596 the village appeared under the name Balata as being in the Nahiya (Subdistrict) of Jabal Qubal, part of Nablus Sanjak. It had a population of 34 households, all Muslim. They paid a fixed tax-rate of 33.3% on agricultural products, including wheat, barley, summer crops, olive trees, goats and beehives, in addition to occasional revenues; a total of 5,200 akçe.

In 1870, Victor Guérin found here a small village, with about twenty houses. It had abundant waters, which were distributed to the fields in a canal, with "beautiful antique tiles". In 1882, the Palestine Exploration Fund's Survey of Western Palestine described Balata as a small hamlet in the valley, of low howels, near a beautiful spring. On the east were figs and mulberries.

A 1900 report by Conrad Schick for the Palestine Exploration Fund describes Balata as a hamlet made up of a few huts surrounded by gardens that lay to the west of Jacob's Well and its accompanying church complex, at that time in ruins.

British Mandate era
In the 1922 census of Palestine conducted by the British Mandate authorities, Balata had a population of 461; all Muslim, increasing in the 1931 census to 574; 6 Christians and 568 Muslims, in a total of 114 houses.

In the 1945 statistics, Balata had a population of 770 Muslims, with a total of 3,000 dunams of land, living in a built-up area of 25 dunams. Of the land, 95 dunams were plantations and irrigable land, while 1,832 dunams were used for cereals.

Jordanian era
In the wake of the 1948 Arab–Israeli War, and after the 1949 Armistice Agreements, Balata al-Balad came under Jordanian rule. It was annexed by Jordan in 1950. The Palestinian refugee camp of Balata was established directly adjacent to the village in 1950. Its population is significantly larger than that of the village of Balata.

In 1961, the population was 2,292.

1967, aftermath
Since the 1967 Six-Day War, Balata al-Balad has been under Israeli occupation.

During the First Intifada, whenever the refugee camp was placed under curfew by the Israeli occupying authorities, so too was the village.

The village contains an old mosque, five schools, and the village spring, which served as the main water source, is known as Ain el-Khidr. Education and medical services in the Balata refugee camp are provided by UNRWA. While electricity and running water supplies were often irregular, the camp was better off in terms of public services than the village of Balata, which lacked piped water, and depended upon private electricity generators and Israeli-run education and medical services, until some after the establishment of the Palestinian National Authority following the signing of the Oslo Accords in 1993.

USAID sponsors a flagship program involving the Balata Al-Balad Women's Society in the village that seeks to increase coordination between community-based organizations and the Palestinian Ministry of Health to improve the provision of health care services.

References

Bibliography

 
 
 
  (p. 190)
  (p. 149)

External links
 Balata-Albalad Website
  Welcome To Balata
 Survey of Western Palestine, Map 11:  IAA, Wikimedia commons

Neighborhoods of Nablus
Villages in the West Bank
Ancient Samaritan settlements